Lake Barkley Bridge is a four-lane basket handle tied-arch bridge in western Kentucky carrying US 68, Kentucky Route 80, and a multi-use path across Lake Barkley, permitting access from the east to Land Between the Lakes National Recreation Area. It is illuminated with LED lights.

Current bridge

The current bridge replaced the Henry R. Lawrence Memorial Bridge, originally built in 1932. It was opened to some traffic in 2018 to allow the old bridge to be demolished. The multi-use trail opened on September 13, 2019 and a ribbon-cutting ceremony was held on September 25, 2019.

The replacement was part of a project that also replaced its sister bridge, Eggner's Ferry Bridge over Kentucky Lake. Due to their location in the New Madrid Seismic Zone and their intended use as an evacuation route during an emergency, the new bridges were designed to withstand a large earthquake, as well as meet current highway standards.

Henry R. Lawrence Memorial Bridge

This bridge was named posthumously after newspaperman and former Speaker of the Kentucky House of Representatives Henry R. Lawrence (died 1933) of The Cadiz Record, due to his advocacy for good roads and bridges. In 1962, the bridge was closed until late 1963, during which time the crossing was served by a ferry, and raised  to allow clearance when the Cumberland River, which it crossed, was impounded and the valley flooded to create Lake Barkley. It was deemed eligible for inclusion on the National Register of Historic Places in 1982, as a product of the Murphy Toll Bridge Act of 1928.

References

External links
The Lake Bridges of Western Kentucky, a PBS documentary from KET about the new Lake Barkley and Eggner's Ferry Bridges
New Lake Barkley Bridge on Bridges & Tunnels
Old Lake Barkley Bridge (Henry R. Lawrence Memorial Bridge) on Bridges & Tunnels
Lake Barkley Bridge (Henry R. Lawrence Memorial Bridge) on Historical Bridges

U.S. Route 68
Bridges over the Cumberland River
Road bridges in Kentucky
Kentucky Route 80
Buildings and structures in Trigg County, Kentucky
Bridges of the United States Numbered Highway System
Tied arch bridges
Transportation in Trigg County, Kentucky